Joseph René Éric Charron (born January 14, 1970) is a Canadian former ice hockey defenceman.

Playing career
Charron was born in Verdun, Quebec. As a youth, he played in the 1982 and 1983 Quebec International Pee-Wee Hockey Tournaments with a minor ice hockey team from Verdun. Originally drafted 20th overall in the 1988 NHL Entry Draft by the Montreal Canadiens, Charron has also played for the Tampa Bay Lightning, Washington Capitals and Calgary Flames. He also had spells in Germany, United Kingdom and Russia.

Career statistics

References

External links

1970 births
Living people
Adler Mannheim players
Atlanta Knights players
Calgary Flames players
Canadian ice hockey defencemen
Cleveland Lumberjacks players
Fredericton Canadiens players
French Quebecers
HC Sibir Novosibirsk players
Ice hockey people from Montreal
Montreal Canadiens draft picks
Montreal Canadiens players
National Hockey League first-round draft picks
Nottingham Panthers players
People from Verdun, Quebec
Portland Pirates players
Saint-Hyacinthe Laser players
Saint John Flames players
Sherbrooke Canadiens players
Tampa Bay Lightning players
Trois-Rivières Draveurs players
Verdun Junior Canadiens players
Washington Capitals players
Canadian expatriate ice hockey players in England
Canadian expatriate ice hockey players in Germany
Canadian expatriate ice hockey players in Russia